Baron Clitheroe of Downham in the County of Lancaster is a title in the Peerage of the United Kingdom. It was created in the 1955 Birthday Honours for the Conservative politician Ralph Assheton, who had previously served as Financial Secretary to the Treasury. He was the son of Ralph Cockayne Assheton, for many years a member of the Lancashire County Council, who had been created  baronet of Downham in the County of Lancaster, on 4 September 1945. Three months after being raised to the peerage, Lord Clitheroe succeeded his father in the baronetcy. , the titles are held by the first Baron's son, the second Baron, who succeeded in 1984.

In the immediate aftermath of World War II, Ralph Assheton also acquired title to the  manorial and mineral rights as well as land holdings within the former Honour of Clitheroe.  These were purchased out of the Clitheroe Estate Company following its administration in 1945.  They included the Lordship of the Forest of Pendle. 

The Assheton family, also spelled Ashton, derive from Ashton-under-Lyne. The military commander Sir John de Assheton (or de Ashton) was among their ancestors.

The family seat is Downham Hall, near Downham, Lancashire.

Assheton baronets of Downham (1945)
Sir Ralph Cockayne Assheton, 1st Baronet (1860–1955)
Sir Ralph Assheton, 2nd Baronet (1901–1984) (created Baron Clitheroe in 1955)

Barons Clitheroe (1955)
Ralph Assheton, 1st Baron Clitheroe (1901–1984)
Ralph John Assheton, 2nd Baron Clitheroe (b. 1929)

The heir apparent is the present holder's son Hon. Ralph Christopher Assheton (b. 1962).
The heir apparent's heir apparent is his son Ralph Anthony Assheton (b. 1998).

Line of Succession

  Sir Ralph Cockayne Assheton of Downham, 1st Baronet (1860—1955)
  Ralph Assheton, 1st Baron Clitheroe (1901—1984)
  Ralph John Assheton, 2nd Baron Clitheroe (b. 1929)
 (1) Hon. Ralph Christopher Assheton (b. 1962)
 (2) Ralph Anthony Assheton (b. 1998)
 (3) Hon. John Hotham Assheton (b. 1964)
 (4) William Hotham Assheton (b. 1992)
 (5) James Charles Assheton (b. 1999)
 Hon. Nicholas Assheton (1934—2012)
 (6) Thomas Assheton (b. 1963)
 (7) Noah Frederick Assheton (b. 1991)

References

Baronies in the Peerage of the United Kingdom
Noble titles created in 1955
Ashton family
1955 establishments in the United Kingdom
Noble titles created for UK MPs